Agyneta simplex is a species of sheet weaver found in Canada and the United States. It was described by Emerton in 1926.

References

simplex
Spiders of North America
Spiders described in 1926